Highway 22 (AR 22, Ark. 22, and Hwy. 22) is an east–west state highway in the Arkansas River Valley. It is maintained by the Arkansas State Highway and Transportation Department (AHTD). The highway runs  from US 64/US 71B east to Highway 7 in Dardanelle. Following the historic stagecoach line of the cross-country Butterfield Trail, the highway is one of the original 1926 state highways. It is designated by the AHTD as the True Grit Trail.

Route description
The route begins in Fort Smith at US 64/US 71B. It runs east, crossing I-540/US 71 and the incomplete interchange at the northern end of future I-49. From its western terminus in Fort Smith it carries the Seminole route of the Trail of Tears to AR 255 where the historic route follows AR 255 heading north. From the junction with AR 255, AR 22 concurs with AR 255 through Fort Chaffee and intersects AR 96 east of the installation. The route next enters Charleston where it meets AR 217 and the historic Butterfield Trail. The historic route continues along AR 22 to its eastern terminus in Dardanelle. Continuing east into Branch the highway crosses AR 41. County Line High School is located on the highway between Branch and Ratcliff.

In the town of Caulksville AR 22 has a junction with AR 23. Continuing east into the city of Paris the highway has junctions with AR 109, AR 288, and AR 309. AR 22/AR 109/AR 288 run together until Subiaco, when the route loses AR 288 but crosses AR 197. AR 109 leaves AR 22 in Midway, heading north towards Clarksville. AR 22 continues alone to Dardanelle, passing through the communities of New Blaine and Delaware along the way. In Dardanelle, the route terminates at AR 7 after a very brief concurrency with AR 155.

The road itself is fairly straight and in reasonably good repair.  Passing can be safely accomplished in several stretches of Highway 22 despite a lack of constructed passing areas.

History

The precursor to today's AR 22 was the Butterfield Trail, a stagecoach trail officially known as the Overland Mail Company that traveled roughly along the present-day highway's route from Dardanelle to Fort Smith. The stagecoach carried mail and passengers from Memphis to Fort Smith. In Fort Smith the trail split into two routes, with one traveling west to San Francisco and the other traveling north to St. Louis. The Butterfield Trail was in operation from 1858 to 1861.

Upon its establishment, AR 22 was one of the original 1926 Arkansas state highways. AR 22 ran from Fort Smith to Dardanelle along a routing very similar to the modern-day routing of AR 22. On July 14, 2015 the highway was linked to Future I-49 in Barling. In June 2019 a proposal was made under the Connecting Arkansas Program-2 for US$25 million to be allocated to the improvement of sections of AR 22 between Fort Smith and Charleston. On March 20 of the same year, the highway was officially designated by the AHTD as the True Grit Trail. The name comes from the 1968 novel, True Grit by Charles Portis. Frank Ross, father of the protagonist Mattie Ross, travels along Highway 22 from Dardanelle to Fort Smith.

National Register of Historic Places
Three original segments of Highway 22 remain intact and are listed on the National Register of Historic Places. The New Blaine segment was listed in 2003, the Barling segment was listed in May 2007, and the Yell County segment was listed in 2008. All three listings are contained within the Arkansas Highway History and Architecture Multiple Property Submission, which preserves history from Arkansas's highway building era between 1910 and 1965.

Barling
The Old Arkansas 22, Barling Segment is a historic section of roadway in Barling, Arkansas.  Now named Mayo Drive, it consists of a  stretch of concrete pavement, two lanes wide, in the northwestern part of the city. It extends north from the current alignment of Highway 22 until it reaches a sharp curve, where the pavement narrows significantly, before continuing westward to rejoin the highway. This stretch of pavement was constructed in 1928 by the Koss Construction Company, and is longest section of surviving pavement of the early alignment of Highway 22.

New Blaine
Old Arkansas Highway 22 is a historic roadway section in New Blaine, Arkansas. It consists of an S-shaped section asphalt,  in length, built in 1930 by Cook & Ransom and the Schultz Construction Company to carry Highway 22. This section was bypassed by the present alignment in the 1960s. It is now designated as part of Arkansas Highway 197, the AR 197 Loop, and Rainbow Loop, and continues to provide the primary access to the town center.

Yell County
This segment was listed on the National Register of Historic Places in 2008.

Major intersections

See also

 National Register of Historic Places listings in Logan County, Arkansas
 National Register of Historic Places listings in Sebastian County, Arkansas
 National Register of Historic Places listings in Yell County, Arkansas

References

External links

022
Transportation in Sebastian County, Arkansas
Transportation in Franklin County, Arkansas
Transportation in Logan County, Arkansas
Transportation in Yell County, Arkansas
National Register of Historic Places in Logan County, Arkansas
Buildings and structures completed in 1929
Roads on the National Register of Historic Places in Arkansas
Buildings and structures completed in 1928
Buildings and structures in Sebastian County, Arkansas
National Register of Historic Places in Sebastian County, Arkansas
National Register of Historic Places in Yell County, Arkansas